Tip commonly refers to:
 Tip (gambling)
 Tip (gratuity)
 Tip (law enforcement)
 another term for Advice
Tip or TIP may also refer to:

Science and technology
 Tank phone, a device allowing infantry to communicate with the occupants of an armoured vehicle
 Targeted intervention program, a type of medication therapy management
 Telecom Infra Project
 Tip and ring, two wires in a telephone line
 Terminal indecomposable past set
 Texas Instruments Power, a series of transistors
 Third-order intercept point, a measure of linearity in amplifiers and mixers
 Titanium(III) phosphide, a semiconductor
 Treatise on Invertebrate Paleontology
 TM Forum Integration Program, a framework of Frameworx

Computing
 Tip (Unix utility), a software program for remote terminal sessions
 Terminal Interface Processor, used to provide terminal sessions on ARPANET
 Threat Intelligence Platform, an emerging technology discipline that helps organizations manage threat data from multiple sources
 GNU nano or TIP, a text editor program

Music
 Tip (rapper) or T.I. (born 1980), American rapper
 Tip (album), an album by Finger Eleven
 T.I.P. (album), an album by Young Buck
 The Tip (album), an album by David Murray

Politics
 The Independent Party, a political party in Kenya
 Thurrock Independents Party, a political party in the United Kingdom
 Tigray Independence Party, a political party in Ethiopia
 Transition Integrity Project, a group concerned with the 2020 US presidential election
 Turkistan Islamic Party
 Türkiye İşçi Partisi or Workers Party of Turkey

Schools
 Textile Institute of Pakistan
 Technological Institute of the Philippines

Other uses
 Tip (ice hockey), the redirection of a shot on net
 Tip (nickname)
 Tip (sculpture), a sculpture in Milwaukee, Wisconsin
 The Tip, a 1918 film starring Harold Lloyd
 Tip and Tap, the 1974 FIFA World Cup official mascots
 Rubbish tip or landfill
 Square dance tip, a round of two dances in square dancing
 TIP Trailer Services
 Tip TV, an Albanian TV channel for children and teenagers
 Talent Identification Program, a gifted education program at Duke University
 Team Impulse or TiP, a North American League of Legends team
 Princess Ozma or Tip, a character in The Marvelous Land of Oz by L. Frank Baum
 Tripoli International Airport, by IATA airport code
 Tianjin South railway station, China Railway telegraph code TIP
 Trafficking in Persons Report

People with the name
 Tippu Tip (1837–1905), real name Hamad bin Muhammad bin Juma bin Rajab el Murjebi, Swahili-Zanzibari slave trader
 Tip Htila, 19th-20th century Burmese princess and businesswoman

See also
 Tip of the iceberg (disambiguation)
 Hat tip, an expression of recognition or gratitude
 List of typhoons named Tip
 Spoil tip, a mound of waste material created during mining operations
 Tipp (disambiguation)
 Tipping (disambiguation)
 Tipping point (disambiguation)
 Tips (disambiguation)